

Events
June 28 – Adolphe Sax patents the saxophone.
August 16 – Gioachino Rossini marries artist's model Olympe Pélissier.
Electric spotlighting is installed at the Paris Opera.

Published popular music
"Lijepa naša domovino" Croatian national anthem m. Josip Runjanin w. Antun Mihanović (written in 1835)
"The Indian's Prayer"     w. Anonymous, m. I.B. Woodbury
"There's a Good Time Coming" by Stephen Foster
"Well-A-Day" by George Linley
"When the Swallows Homeward Fly"     w.m. Franz Abt

Oratorio
César Franck – Ruth
Felix Mendelssohn – Elijah

Classical music
Hector Berlioz – La damnation de Faust
Anton Bruckner 
Tantum ergo, WAB 41, 42
"Ständchen", WAB 84.2
Frederic Chopin
Polonaise-Fantaisie
Barcarolle
Cello Sonata
Carl Czerny – Impromptu Fugué, Op.776
Heinrich Wilhelm Ernst – Rondo Papageno, Op.20
Henry Litolff – Concerto Symphonique No 3 in E-flat, Op. 45 (approximately 1846)
Fanny Mendelssohn 
4 Lieder for Piano, Op.2
Allegretto (C♯ minor), H-U 420 (Op.4, No.2)
Felix Mendelssohn – Lauda Sion, Op. 73
Jules Perrot – Catarina or La Fille du Bandit (ballet)
František Škroup – Clarinet Trio, Op.27

Opera
Julius Benedict – The Crusaders
Eduard James Loder – The Night Dancers
Albert Lortzing – Der Waffenschmied
Johan Peter Emilius Hartmann – Liden Kirsten, Op.44, premiered May 12 in Copenhagen
Saverio Mercadante – Orazi e Curiazi
Karel Miry – Wit en zwart (opera in 1 act, with libretto by Hippoliet van Peene, premièred on January 18 in Ghent)
Franz von Suppé – Poet and Peasant (24 August, Theater an der Wien, Vienna)

Births
January 2 – Sándor Erkel, Hungarian composer, son of Ferenc Erkel
February 24 – Luigi Denza, composer (d. 1922)
February 26 – Amanda Forsberg, ballerina (date of death unknown)
February 27 – Joaquín Valverde Durán, flautist, conductor and composer (d. 1910)
March 7 – Peppino Turco, songwriter (d. 1907)
March 11 – Constance Bache, composer (died 1903)
March 29 – Louise Pyk, Swedish opera singer (d. 1929)
April 2 – Albert Périlhou, organist, pianist and composer (d. 1936)
May 2 – Zygmunt Noskowski, conductor and composer (d. 1909)
May 22 – Francis Hueffer, music critic (d. 1889)
June 23 – Anton Svendsen, violinist (died 1930)
July 2 – Rosina Brandram, opera singer and actress (d. 1907)
July 3 – Achilles Alferaki, composer (died 1919)
July 22 – Alfred Perceval Graves, lyricist (died 1931)
July 29 – Sophie Menter, pianist and composer (d. 1918)
August 17 – Marie Jaëll, composer (died 1925)
August 24 – Paul Rougnon, pianist and composer (d. 1934)
September 21
Catherine Chislova, ballerina (d. 1889)
Juliana Walanika, the "Hawaiian Nightingale", court singer (d. 1931)
October 20 – Johan Amberg, composer (d. 1928)
November 7 – Ignaz Brüll, pianist and composer (d. 1907)
November 23 – Ernst von Schuch, conductor (d. 1914)
date unknown 
José María de Arteaga y Pereira, composer (died 1913)
Valentina Serova, composer (d. 1924)

Deaths
February 3 – Joseph Weigl the younger, composer and conductor (b. 1766)
February 13 – Johann Bernhard Logier, music teacher (b. 1777)
February 18 
William Hawes, choirmaster (b. 1785)
Gottlob Schuberth, musician (born 1778)
February 22 – Carel Anton Fodor, Dutch pianist and conductor (b. 1768)
April 16 – Domenico Dragonetti, double-bass player (b. 1763)
April 24 – Girolamo Crescentini, castrato singer (b. 1766)
July 23 – Christian Heinrich Rinck, organist and composer (b. 1770)
August 10 – Johann Simon Hermstedt, clarinettist (b. 1778)
August 27 – Gottfried Wilhelm Fink, music theorist (born 1783)
September 14 – Carl Almenräder, bassoonist and composer (b. 1786)
November 1 – Franz Anton Ries, violinist (b. 1755)
November 30 – Maria Severa Onofriana, Portuguese singer and guitarist, considered the founder of fado (b. 1820)
December 12 – Eliza Flower, musician and composer (b. 1803)
December 25 – Swathi Thirunal Rama Varma, Maharajah of Travancore, musician, composer and patron of the arts (b. 1813)
date unknown
Dede Efendi, composer (b. 1778)
Mykola Ovsianiko-Kulikovsky, subject of a famous musical hoax
Sophie Weber, singer (b. c. 1763)

References

 
19th century in music
Music by year